Sausage Software was an Australian software company, founded by entrepreneur Steve Outtrim, which produced one of the world's most successful web editors: the HotDog web authoring tool. The product and company name have since been purchased by an Australian consulting firm, SMS Management & Technology.

HotDog and the company became the 'dotcom darling' of the Australian media receiving a large amount of media exposure due to the young age of the company's founder and staff featuring pinball machines and a pool table in the company's reception area.

Sausage Software also invested in various other pioneering software strategies and products:

 A range of small independent software products called "snaglets"
 A unique freeware texture generator called Reptile
 An early micro-payment system called the eVend Cashlet
 A Java Electronic Commerce Server (JECS), a generalized middleware layer serving Java Applets with database data on request via an XML-like request/response protocol.

Their website was one of the most popular at the time, receiving 250,000 hits per day in 1996.

Products
Software

Snaglets

Other
 Weenies

Source:

References

External links
 
 

Defunct software companies of Australia